Porter Township is the name of some places in the U.S. state of Michigan:

 Porter Township, Cass County, Michigan
 Porter Township, Midland County, Michigan
 Porter Township, Van Buren County, Michigan

See also

Porter Township (disambiguation)

Michigan township disambiguation pages